Milan "Gale" Muškatirović (9 March 1934 – 27 September 1993) was a Yugoslav water polo goalkeeper. He is considered to have been one of the best goalkeepers of his era. He was part of the Yugoslav teams that won a silver medal at the 1964 Olympics and placed fourth in 1960. He won another silver medal at the 1958 European Championships. In 1959 he graduated from the University of Belgrade, and since 1965 worked as professor of organic chemistry there.

See also
 Yugoslavia men's Olympic water polo team records and statistics
 List of Olympic medalists in water polo (men)
 List of men's Olympic water polo tournament goalkeepers

References

External links
 

1934 births
1993 deaths
People from Bihać
Bosnia and Herzegovina male water polo players
Yugoslav male water polo players
Water polo goalkeepers
Olympic water polo players of Yugoslavia
Water polo players at the 1960 Summer Olympics
Water polo players at the 1964 Summer Olympics
Olympic silver medalists for Yugoslavia
Olympic medalists in water polo
Medalists at the 1964 Summer Olympics
University of Belgrade alumni
Academic staff of the University of Belgrade
Mediterranean Games silver medalists for Yugoslavia
Competitors at the 1963 Mediterranean Games
Mediterranean Games medalists in water polo
Serbs of Bosnia and Herzegovina